Clinton Darryl Mansell (born 7 January 1963) is an English musician, singer, and composer. He served as the lead vocalist of alt-rock band Pop Will Eat Itself. After the band's dissolution, Mansell moved to the United States and embarked on a career as a film score composer. 

Mansell partnered with American filmmaker Darren Aronofsky and composed the scores for his films Pi, Requiem for a Dream, The Fountain, The Wrestler, Black Swan, and Noah. Mansell is best known for the Requiem for a Dream soundtrack, particularly the film's composition "Lux Aeterna" and a re-orchestrated version titled "Requiem for a Tower" that was created for The Lord of the Rings: The Two Towers trailer, both of which have been featured in multiple advertisements, films, film trailers, video games and other media.

He has also provided the scores for the Ben Wheatley films High-Rise, Happy New Year, Colin Burstead and Rebecca and In the Earth. Other films featuring Mansell's scores include Sahara, Moon and Stoker. He has also composed music for television and video games.

Mansell's work on The Fountain was nominated for a Golden Globe and he was nominated for a Grammy Award for his work on Black Swan.

Early life
Mansell was born in Coventry, England. His father worked for the electricity board and his mother was a preparer of school meals. 

Inspired by David Bowie's performance of Starman on the television series Top of the Pops, he started to play guitar at the age of nine. His foray into punk-inspired music was influenced by the Ramones. In 2014 he told Beat Magazine "I heard the Ramones and punk rock changed my life." While living in Stourbridge, Mansell played in rock bands as a youth, and at 19 years of age he joined the band that became Pop Will Eat Itself.

Career

Alt-rock career
From the band's inception in 1986 until their dissolution in 1996, Mansell was a member of grebo/alt-rock band Pop Will Eat Itself (PWEI). He served as the band's lead vocalist, guitarist and one of the band's main songwriters. The band was first introduced to computer-based music in 1988 while working with producer Flood on their album This Is the Day...This Is the Hour...This Is This!. Their sound evolved to include sampling and electronic music, bringing influences from hip hop, industrial music and other dance genres into their music. After the band was dropped by RCA, PWEI were signed in 1994 to Nothing Records, a label owned by Trent Reznor of Nine Inch Nails.

Following PWEI's break-up in 1996, Mansell moved to New York, where he hoped to start a solo career, but struggled creatively. He was invited by Reznor to move to an apartment in New Orleans owned by Reznor, where Mansell lived for three years, prior to settling in Los Angeles. It was there that Reznor mentored Mansell and introduced him to Pro Tools. Mansell also performed backing vocals on Nine Inch Nails' 1999 album The Fragile.

Mansell reunited with PWEI in 2005 for their "Reformation" tour, which included performances in Nottingham, Birmingham and London, England.

Film score career

While still living in New York, Mansell was introduced to director Darren Aronofsky by a mutual friend. Aronofsky was unaware of Mansell's previous work with Pop Will Eat Itself, however the two men bonded over their love of hip hop and their belief that "film music at the time was terrible."

Aronofky suggested that Mansell write the opening title piece for Pi, Aronfsky's feature film directorial debut. Aronofsky had intended to use pre-existing electronic music in the rest of the film, but due to a lack of funds, he found it difficult to acquire the rights to much of the music that interested him and Mansell was hired to provide music for the entire film. Mansell's score for the film won him the City of Birmingham award at the Birmingham Film Festival in 2000.

Mansell wrote the score for Aronofsky's next film, Requiem for a Dream, which became a cult hit. The film's primary composition "Lux Aeterna" became a favorite in its own right. A re-orchestrated version of the song, titled "Requiem for a Tower", was arranged by composers Simone Benyacar, Dan Nielsen and Veigar Margeirsson for the trailer of The Lord of the Rings: The Two Towers. 

Both "Lux Aeterna" and "Requiem for a Tower" have been used in multiple forms of media, including the film trailers for The Da Vinci Code, I Am Legend, Sunshine and Babylon A.D.; trailers for the video games Assassin's Creed and Lord of the Rings: Return of the King; advertising campaigns for such products as Canon PowerShot cameras, Molson Canadian beer; and on television such as in the series America's Got Talent, So You Think You Can Dance as well as a promo spot the series Flash Forward.

In 2006, Mansell provided the score for the film Smokin' Aces and he received a BMI Film & TV Award for his work on the film Sahara that same year. The following year, his score for the Aronofsky film The Fountain was awarded Best Original Film Score of the Year and the Public Choice Award at the 7th World Soundtrack Awards. The Fountains score was also nominated for Best Score in a Motion Picture at the 2007 Golden Globe Awards.  

Mansell's score for Aronofsky's Black Swan garnered him multiple nominations and awards. He was nominated for the Grammy Award for Best Score Soundtrack for Visual Media as well as for Best Original Sountrack (for Black Swan) and Soundtrack Composer of the Year (for Black Swan, Last Night and Faster) at the 11th World Soundtrack Awards. The score was deemed ineligible for the Academy Award for Best Original Score due to its use of Tchaikovsky's original music from Swan Lake.

Mansell created the film score for Moon, Duncan Joness feature film directorial debut. Mansell won Best Technical Achievement at the	British Independent Film Awards for Moons score. In 2011 Mansell was hired to provide the score for The Iron Lady, but he was later replaced by composer Thomas Newman. Nevertheless, Mansell's music from the film Moon was used in the film's trailer and was also used in the 2012 trailer of the computer game Aliens: Colonial Marines.

Mansell provided the scores for the films Stoker (also featuring music by Philip Glass) and Filth, which were both released in 2013.

Filmmaker Ben Wheatley, who was a fan of Mansell's music for the films Requiem for a Dream and Moon, approached Mansell about providing the score for his 2015 film High-Rise. Mansell also provided the music for Wheatley's subsequent works Happy New Year, Colin Burstead (2018) and Rebecca (2020) and In the Earth (2021).

Mansell's film scores have been sampled by such musical artists as Lil Jon, A$AP Rocky, Bastille and Paul Oakenfold.

Having no formal training in musical notation, Mansell constructs his film scores using the method he employs for writing rock music — drums, bass, guitar and vocal lines — in addition to employing an orchestrator. Some of his influences include Philip Glass, Trevor Jones, David Holmes, and bands such as Death in Vegas, Mogwai and Unkle.

Symphonic performances
Mansell has performed some of his film compositions live with the Sonus Quartet in the US, the UK and Australia. The Kronos Quartet, who performed "Lux Alternae" for the Requiem for a Dream soundtrack, have also performed some of Mansell's work live.

Publishing deal 
In February 2019, Mansell signed a publishing deal with Decca Publishing, a division of Decca Records. This deal brought his catalogue of more than 650 original pieces, including his Pop Will Eat Itself work, under a single umbrella for the first time.

Awards and nominations

Discography

with Pop Will Eat Itself

 Box Frenzy (1987)
 This Is the Day...This Is the Hour...This Is This! (1989)
 Cure for Sanity (1990)
 The Looks or the Lifestyle? (1992)
 Dos Dedos Mis Amigos (1994)

Live albums
 Weird's Bar and Grill (Live) (1993) UK No. 44
 The Radio 1 Sessions 1986-87 (1997)
 Reformation: Nottingham Rock City 20.01.05 (2005)
 Reformation: Birmingham Carling Academy 22.01.05 (2005)
 Reformation: Birmingham Carling Academy 23.01.05 (2005)
 Reformation: London Shepherds Bush Empire 24.01.05 (2005)
 Reformation: London Shepherds Bush Empire 25.01.05 (2005)

Film scores and soundtracks

Film

Television

Video games

Short films

References

External links
 
 

1963 births
British indie rock musicians
English rock singers
British alternative rock musicians
English industrial musicians
English film score composers
English male film score composers
Living people
Musicians from Coventry
Pop Will Eat Itself members
Varèse Sarabande Records artists
Rykodisc artists
Nonesuch Records artists